Georgian may refer to:

Common meanings
 Anything related to, or originating from Georgia (country)
Georgians, an indigenous Caucasian ethnic group
Georgian language, a Kartvelian language spoken by Georgians
Georgian scripts, three scripts used to write the language
Georgian (Unicode block), a Unicode block containing the Mkhedruli and Asomtavruli scripts
Georgian cuisine, cooking styles and dishes with origins in the nation of Georgia and prepared by Georgian people around the world
 Someone from Georgia (U.S. state)
 Georgian era, a period of British history (1714–1837)
Georgian architecture, the set of architectural styles current between 1714 and 1837

Places 
Georgian Bay, a bay of Lake Huron
Georgian Cliff, a cliff on Alexander Island, Antarctica

Airlines 
Georgian Airways, an airline based in Tbilisi, Georgia
Georgian International Airlines, an airline based in Tbilisi, Georgia
Air Georgian, an airline based in Ontario, Canada
Sky Georgia, an airline based in Tbilisi, Georgia

Schools 
Georgian College, in Barrie, Ontario, Canada
Georgian International Academy, a research and academic institution in Tbilisi, Georgia
Georgian Technical University, a technical university in Tbilisi, Georgia

Arts and entertainment 
The Georgians (Frank Guarente), an American jazz and dance band of the 1920s
The Georgians (Nat Gonella), a British jazz band of the 1930s
Georgian poets, a group of early 20th century English poets
Georgian Theatre Royal, a theatre and playhouse in Richmond, North Yorkshire, UK

People

Georgian Păun (born 1985), Romanian footballer
Georgian Popescu (born 1984), Romanian amateur boxer
Georgian Tobă (born 1989), Romanian footballer

Other uses 
Atlanta Georgian, a defunct Hearst-owned newspaper
Augusta Georgians, an American minor league baseball team from 1920 to 1921
Georgian Mall, a mall in Barrie, Ontario, Canada
Georgian (train), a Chicago-to-Atlanta passenger train route

See also
Georgia (disambiguation)

Romanian masculine given names